The following is a list of Lafayette Leopards men's basketball head coaches. There have been 26 head coaches of the Leopards in their 113-season history.

Lafayette's current head coach is Mike McGarvey. He was named acting head coach in February 2023, after head coach Mike Jordan was placed on paid leave. Jordan was hired in March 2022, replacing Fran O'Hanlon, who retired after the 2021–22 season.

References

Lafayette

Lafayette Leopards basketball, men's, coaches